William Haile (May 1807July 22, 1876) was an American merchant, manufacturer and politician who served as the 26th governor of New Hampshire.

Biography
Haile was born in Putney, Vermont in May 1807. He was educated in the local schools of Putney, and as a teenager he moved to Chesterfield, New Hampshire to work in a store and learn the mercantile business.

Haile's later operated his own store, which he later moved to Hinsdale, and he established Haile, Frost and Company, a business that produced flannel cloth and clothing items.

Originally a Democrat with nativist and antislavery views, Haile served in the New Hampshire House of Representatives from 1846 to 1850, and in 1853 and 1856.  He was a member of the New Hampshire State Senate from 1854 to 1856, and was senate president in 1855.

Haile became a Republican when the party was founded in 1854, and was the party's successful nominee for governor in 1857.  He was reelected in 1858, and served from June 4, 1857 to June 2, 1859.

In 1873 Haile moved to Keene, New Hampshire.  He died in Keene on July 22, 1876, and was buried at Pine Grove Cemetery in Hinsdale.

His son, William H. Haile, served as Lieutenant Governor of Massachusetts from 1890 to 1893.

References

William Haile at National Governors Association

External links 
 Haile at New Hampshire's Division of Historic Resources

William Haile at National Cyclopaedia of American Biography, Volume XI (1901)

1807 births
1876 deaths
Republican Party New Hampshire state senators
People from Putney, Vermont
Democratic Party members of the New Hampshire House of Representatives
Democratic Party New Hampshire state senators
Presidents of the New Hampshire Senate
Republican Party governors of New Hampshire
Burials in New Hampshire
19th-century American politicians
People from Hinsdale, New Hampshire